Opasno is the debut album by Macedonian pop musician, Elvir Mekić. It was released in 2007.

Track listings

Bonus track

2007 albums